Satkhira Government High School (SGHS) is a public high school situated at the centre of Satkhira town in the Satkhira district, part of the Khulna division, in south-western Bangladesh. It is housed in a two-story 'L' shaped building.

The school celebrated 50 years foundation day in 2012.

Students uniform
Students follow the dress code below:

 White half Shirt with school logo (summer)
 White full Shirt with school logo (winter)
 Bottle green pant
 Black belt
 White shoe
 White socks

Seat management

References

High schools in Bangladesh
Educational institutions established in 1962
Educational institutions of Khulna Division
1962 establishments in East Pakistan